The Dalton School, originally the Children's University School, is a private, coeducational college preparatory school in New York City and a member of both the Ivy Preparatory School League and the New York Interschool. The school is located in four buildings within the Upper East Side of Manhattan. In November 2021, it was announced that José Manuel De Jesús would replace Interim Head of School Ellen Stein as Head in July 2022. Former Head of School Jim Best resigned in April 2021 after 16 years at the school.

History

The Dalton School, originally called the Children's University School, was founded by Helen Parkhurst in 1919. Parkhurst's "Dalton Plan", to which the school still adheres, reflected the Progressive Education movement that had begun in the late 19th century.

After experimentation in her own one-room school with Maria Montessori, Helen Parkhurst visited other progressive schools in Europe including Bedales School and its founder and headmaster John Haden Badley in England. She developed what she termed the Dalton Plan, which called for teachers and students to work together toward individualized goals. The Laboratory Plan was first put into effect as an experiment in the high school of Dalton, Massachusetts, in 1916. The estate of her benefactor Josephine Porter Boardman, was also near the town of Dalton and from this beginning the Laboratory Plan and school eventually took their names.

In 1919, Helen Parkhurst relocated to New York City, where she opened her first school on West 74th Street. Larger facilities soon became necessary; the Lower School was moved to West 72nd Street, and the High School opened in the autumn of 1929 in the current building at 108 East 89th Street. Eleanor Roosevelt admired the work of Helen Parkhurst and played an important role in expanding the population and resources of the school by promoting a merger between the Todhunter School for girls (founded by Winifred Todhunter) and Dalton in 1939.

Enlarged and modified through the years, Dalton still celebrates many of the school-wide traditions begun by Helen Parkhurst, including the Candlelighting Ceremony (the last day before winter break), Greek Festival (performed by sixth graders), and Arch Day (the last day of school). Academically, the school still subscribes to the Dalton Plan, which Parkhurst helped to create. Over the years, the Dalton Plan has been adopted by schools around the world, including schools in Australia, Austria, Belgium, Chile, the Czech Republic, England, Korea, the Netherlands, and Japan.

Athletics and other co-curricular activities

The Dalton School is a part of the Ivy Preparatory School League in athletics. Some teams, such as varsity football, participate in different athletic conferences. Dalton offers 23 varsity teams (including a cheerleading squad) and nine junior varsity teams in the high school athletics program.  The school colors were historically gold and blue, although they have been changed to blue and white (based on common misunderstanding). The sports range from squash and golf, to soccer and lacrosse. The school's mascot is a tiger whose name is Ivan.

The Daltonian is Dalton's official student newspaper and is published every 2–3 weeks by the High School students. Middle and High School students also produce other publications, including the political journal Realpolitik, literary magazine Blue Flag, visual art magazine Fine Arts, photography magazine Shutterbug, and a middle school blog, the Dalton Paw.

Admission
Admission to Dalton was according to the following criteria. For kindergarten to third grade, admission is based on school records, ERB testing, and interview. For grades 4–12, admission is based on school records, writing samples, an interview, and standardized testing (e.g., the Independent School Entrance Examination and the Secondary School Admission Test). Candidates receive notification of acceptance, rejection, or wait list in February. As of early 2013, the overall acceptance rate for grades K–12 at Dalton was reported by Peterson's to be 14%.

Parental anxiety created by the highly competitive admission process was the subject of press coverage from 1999-2001.

Long seen as a bastion of privilege, Dalton's efforts to broaden its mandate for diversity have met with some difficulty. In 2010, a financial aid budget of $6.5 million supported an outreach program for socio-economic diversity at the school. As of this date,  students of color made up 38% of the Dalton First Program. In the 2008–2009 school year, the kindergarten was composed of 44% children of color. Articles in The New York Times and The Atlantic have described difficulties experienced by some African-American children at the school.

American Promise was a PBS documentary that followed two African American students who enrolled at Dalton as kindergartners and the challenges they faced due to Dalton's lack of diversity. In 2020, Dalton found itself in controversy during the broader diversity, equity, and inclusion movement that followed the murder of George Floyd. The discussions continued into the following school year and resulted in the departure of school head Jim Best.

Notable people

Alumni
 Ronnie Abrams, judge
 Dan Barber, chef
 Tony Blinken, current U.S. Secretary of State
 Montgomery Clift, actor
 Anderson Cooper, journalist
 Rachel Covey, actress 
 Claire Danes, actress
 Edward Downes, musicologist and radio quizmaster
 Naomi Ekperigin, writer and comedian
 Edgar de Evia, photographer
 Samuel R. Delany, writer
 Maxim Dlugy, chess grandmaster
Shaun Donovan, former U.S. Secretary of Housing and Urban Development and Director of the Office of Management and Budget
 Noah Emmerich, actor
 Mark Feuerstein, actor
 Frances FitzGerald, journalist
 Barrett Foa, actor
 Helen Frankenthaler, abstract expressionist painter
 Laura Geller, rabbi
 Alexis Glick, television personality
 Sam Gold, theater director, actor
 Carol Grace, actress
 Jennifer Grey, actress
 Jefferson Y. Han, research scientist
 Hannah Higgins, writer
 Marni Hodgkin, children's book editor
 A. J. Jacobs, journalist
 Jason Jorjani, writer
 Max Joseph, filmmaker
 Brooks Kerr, jazz pianist
 Rachel Kovner, United States federal judge
 Dylan Lauren, businesswoman
 Steve Lemme, actor
 Joshua Katz, classicist
 Sean Lennon, musician
 Andrew Levitas, painter and sculptor
 J. Kenji López-Alt, chef and food writer
 Jenny Lumet, actress and #MeToo activist
 Mary Stuart Masterson, actress
 Helly Nahmad, art dealer
 Jennifer O'Neill, actress
 Morgan Pehme, filmmaker, journalist
 Tracy Pollan, actress
 Dara Resnik, screenwriter and producer
 Simon Rich, writer
 James B. Rosenwald III, entrepreneur
 Matthew Ross, film director, screenwriter, journalist
 Tracee Ellis Ross, actress
 Marco Roth, editor and founder of N+1 magazine
 Melissa Russo, journalist
 Eric Schlosser, journalist
 Wallace Shawn, actor, playwright
 Marian Seldes, actress
 Fazal Sheikh, photographer
 Christian Slater, actor
 Jill Stuart, fashion designer
 Emma Sulkowicz, performance artist
 Veronica Vasicka, record label founder and DJ
 Josh Waitzkin, chess player
 Dean Wareham, musician
 Julie Warner, actress
 Bokeem Woodbine, actor
 David Yassky,  Director, New York City Taxi and Limousine Commission.
 Matt Yglesias, writer
 Andrew Zimmern, chef

Faculty

 Donald Barr, headmaster c. 1964-74
Joe Frank, taught literature and philosophy 1965-1975; radio performer, writer.
 Rhys Caparn, art instructor 1946–1972
 Jeffrey Epstein, taught 1974-76. Financier; convicted sexual predator
 Yves Volel, taught c. 1968-85. Lawyer, activist, assassinated while running for Haitian presidency

See also

References

External links
 Official website

Educational institutions established in 1919
Preparatory schools in New York City
Private K-12 schools in Manhattan
Upper East Side
Ivy Preparatory School League
1919 establishments in New York City